Han Hsiang-ning (born 13 May 1939, ;) is a Taiwanese-American artist. He emigrated to New York from Taiwan in 1967. He joined the O.K. Harris Works of Art from 1971 until 1984. Han has participated in many prominent museum exhibitions. He often uses spray painting and paints photo-realistic street scenes.

Early career in Taiwan
In 1953, he first started oil painting while attending Junior High of National Normal University. He graduated from the Department of Fine Arts of the National Taiwan Normal University in 1960; his graduation Exhibition featured surrealistic oil paintings.

In 1961, he joined the "Fifth Moon Group". He began abstract form oil painting, such as "Worship", "Affair", and his works first appeared in the magazine Pen Review. In 1961 he was selected to represent Taiwan for the exhibition at VI Bienal de São Paulo, Brazil, and was admitted to the 2nd Biennale de Paris. In 1962, Han was visited by New York gallery owner Poindexter. Mrs. Poindexter became the first important New York art dealer collecting Han's works. The following year he had his first exhibitions in Australia and the United States. Exhibitions in Africa followed in 1964.

His first trip outside China or Taiwan came in 1964, when he attended the 4th International Biennial Exhibition of Prints in Tokyo, Japan with Shichi Lee representing Taiwan. His first solo exhibition came the following year, at the National Taiwan Arts Center in Taipei. In 1966 Tehjin Shi introduced Pop art to Taiwan, and influenced Han. "Paintings by the contemporary artist Han" was published by the National Taiwan Arts Center.

United States
In 1967, he emigrated to New York City. He moved to a loft in New York Downtown on West Broadway (now Soho) in 1968. In 1970 Ivan Karp arranged Han's one-man exhibition at French & Company, New York. Whitney Museum curator Marcia Tucker (now the director of the New Museum) arranged for Han to join the "Invisible Image Exhibition" at School of Visual Arts, New York. He completed a series of "Subtle New York Cityscape" works in 1971, such as "Brooklyn Bridge", and held a one-man exhibition at O.K. Harris Gallery, New York.

He made his first trip to Europe and held one-man exhibition in Germany at Galerie Thelan, Cologne. In 1973 he completed his "Views of Washington D.C." series and held a one-man exhibition at Gallery Henry, Washington D.C. Another one-man exhibition at O.K. Harris Gallery, New York, followed in 1974. In 1977 he took a trip to London and Paris for pictures of city scenes, and in 1978 visited Spain, Portugal, France and England.

In 1979 he held a one-man exhibition at Dobrick Gallery, then undertook his first round the world trip, returning to Taiwan for the first time in 12 years. In 1980 he returned to Taipei again and held an exhibition at Printmakers Art Gallery, including two works of Taipei street scenes. "Paintings by H.N. Han" was published by Artist Magazine in Taipei in 1980.

In 1981 his work featured New York people such as "Music of Washington Square", and the works were exhibited at O.K. Harris Gallery in 1982. In 1983 he set up a studio in a country house at Greenwood Lake, N.Y. In 1984 he travelled to Paris, and in 1985 he worked in his Soho and Greenwood Lake studios.

China
In 1986 he was invited by Lee Shichi, director of Asia World Gallery in Taipei, for a one-man exhibition of recent works on people. He returned to China, and visited the Central Academy of Fine Arts, and re-visited Chungchin. In 1987 he started a series of work on the subject of China such as "Chungchin People", "Beijing Crowds" and "Foreigners in Beijing". He held his first group exhibition in Shanghai, China, "Artists from Shanghai and Taiwan", and visited Souzhou, Woxi, Honzhou and the Zhejiang Academy of Fine Arts. In 1989 he first visited Mount Huang, mostly the area of Beihai and Xihai, taking scenes in photos and video.

In 1989 he went to Shanghai on May 4 and observed the Students' Democratic Movement. He returned to New York and painted the "Tiananmem Square" series. In 1990 he exhibited the "Tiananmen Square" and "Mount Huang" series in New York and Taipei. In 1997 he re-visited Mount Huang and continued painting on the subject of Mount Huang.

In 2007 he expanded his studio home in Dali, Yunnan, to become a gallery space.

Stylistic changes
He began with abstract form oil painting, and in 1963 he began working with roller and stencils on rice paper, still abstract, emphasizing form and space structure. He was influenced by pop art from 1966.

In 1969 he began spray painting works using acrylic paint on canvas, created the "Invisible Image" series. In 1971, in the process of spray gun painting, found how to create different combinations of sprayed color dots, a form of pointillism. Based on Seurat's works, a series of "After Seurat" works were painted. In 1971 he continued the spray gun technique, but began using New York city-scenes as a subject and his camera as sketching tool. In 1972 he launched studies on industrial scenes with vivid images.

In 1974 he completed a series of "Soho District" works such as "Soho West Broadway" by using telephoto lenses taking pictures of New York Soho building facades, then in 1975 he painted bird's-eye view street scenes of New York City.  In 1977 he completed "Lunch Time", featuring people as a subject for the first time, using acrylic spray on canvas.

He completed his first self-portrait in 1981. In 1983 he began using brushes to paint watercolor and ink on paper. In 1985, he continued using two different techniques, his subjects being street crowds and bird's eye views of intersections of New York streets. In 1986 he continued to paint subjects of New York street crowds using acrylic spray on giant canvasses. In 1989 he began a series of paintings of "Mount Huang", employing a similar technique to his ink on paper for the New York street crowds.

In 1998 he began making rubbing prints of New York City street textures of manholes and graffiti, doing the same in Taipei the next year.

Teaching
In 1976, he started instructing an apprenticeship program at the Graduate School of New York University. Han served as a visiting artist for the School of the Art Institute of Chicago from 1979.

In 1988 he taught at St. Thomas Aquinas College as a visiting professor.

Personal life
Han was born in 1939 in Chongqing, China; Han's family originally came from Xiangtan, Hunan. In 1942 he 1942 moved to Baogi, Shangshi with parents, and in 1946  they returned to Xiangtan. In 1948 he moved to Quinmin, Yuennan with his mother, then in 1951 he went to Taiwan via Hong Kong, Macao and joined his father.

In 1964 his father died and he met Tsaishuan Chung. In 1968 Chung came to the United States, and married Han. They divorced in 1977.

In 1979 he met Alice Yu at Taipei Printmaker's Art Gallery, and then she visited New York. They married in 1980, and their daughter Eve was born later that year. His second daughter Jacqueline was born in 1981. In 1999 he separated from Yu.

In 2000 he  settled in Old Town Dali City, Yunnan, China, and in 2006 acquired land by Dali Lake and began building a home and studio. In 2008 he turned 70 and celebrated by riding a motorcycle across the town of Dali. He married Yang Lu that same year.

Solo exhibitions 
His works have been exhibited at the Museu de Arte Moderna, São Paulo, Musee d'Arte Moderne, Paris, Museum of Recklinghausen, Germany, Tokyo Metropolitan Art Museum, the 1996 Taipei Biennial organized by the Taipei Fine Arts Museum, Taiwan, The Brooklyn Museum, NY, The Art Institute of Chicago, Whitney Museum of American Art, and the Hirshhorn Museum, D.C.

1996 – Lin&Keng Gallery, Taipei, Taiwan
1994 – A Retrospective, Taipei Fine Arts Museum, Taipei, Taiwan
1992 – Eslite Gallery, Taipei, Taiwan
1990 – Capricorn Galleries, Bathesda, Maryland
1987 – The Hong Kong Institute for Promotion of Chinese Culture, Hong Kong
1986 – Capricorn Galleries, Bethesda, Maryland
1982 – O.K. Harris Works of Art, New York, New York
1979 – Dobrick Gallery, Chicago, Illinois

1976 – O.K. Harris Works of Art, New York, New York
1974 – O.K. Harris Works of Art, New York, New York
1973 – Gallery Henri, Washington D.C.
1972 – Galerie Thelan, Cologne, Germany
1971 – O.K. Harris Works of Art, New York, New York
1970 – French & Company, New York, New York
1965 – National Taiwan Art Center, Taipei, Taiwan

Selected group exhibitions 

1996 – "Post Fifth Moon" Home Gallery, Lin&Keng Gallery, Taipei, Taiwan
1996 – "Taipei Biennial: The Quest for Identity", Taipei Fine Arts Museum, Taipei, Taiwan
1994 – "Image" IT Park Gallery, Taipei, Taiwan
1991 – Taipei - New York, Taipei Fine Arts Museum, Taipei, Taiwan
1991 – Dual Cultures - China & U.S.A.: Six Realist Painters, Nassau County Museum of Art, Roslyn, New York
1985 – Immigrant Artists / American Experience, Bass Museum, Miami, Florida.
1983 – The Great East River Bridge, The Brooklyn Museum, New York
1983 – Painting New York, Museum of the City of New York, New York
1982 – The Artist and the Airbrush, California State University, San Jose, California
1981 – Visions of New York City: American Paintings, Drawings & Prints of 20th Century, Tokyo Metropolitan Art Museum, Tokyo, Japan
1979 – Auto - Icon, Whitney Museum of American Art, New York, N.Y.

1979 – 20th Century American Painting, American Embassy, Moscow, USSR
1979 – America in the 70's as Depicted by Artists in the Richard Brown Baker Collection, Meadow Brook Art Gallery, Oakland University, Rochester, Michigan
1978 – Art and the Automobile, Flint Institute of Arts, Michigan
1977 – New Realism, Jacksonville Art Museum, Jacksonville, Florida
1976 – Bicentennial: Artist-Immigrants of American, 1876–1976, Hirshhorn Museum, Smithsonian Institution, Washington D.C.
1975 – A Change of View, The Aldrich Museum of Contemporary Art, Connecticut
1974 – Painting & Sculpture Today, Indianapolis Museum of Art, Indianapolis, Indiana
1974 – Seventy-first American Exhibition, The Art Institute of Chicago Chicago, Illinois
1973 – Mit Kamera, Pinsel und Spritzpistole, Museum of Recklinghausen, Germany
1974 – New York Avent-Garde '74, Saidye Bronfman Centre, Montreal, Quebec, Canada
1972 – Realism Now, New York Cultural Center, New York, N.Y.
1961 – VI Bienal de São Paulo, Museu de Art Moderna, São Paulo, Brazil

Major collections 

Hirshhorn Museum, Smithsonian Institution, Washington, D.C.
Akron Art Institute, Akron, Ohio
Richard Brown Baker Collection, New.York, New York
Indianapolis Museum of Art, Indianapolis, Indiana
Chase Manhattan Bank Collection, New York, New York
The Denver Art Museum, Denver, Colorado
The Commodities Corporation Collection, Princeton, New Jersey
Schroeder Bank Collection, New York, New York

American Public Insurance Collection, Iowa, Iowa
Phil Desind Collection, Bathesda, Maryland
Stermann Collection, West Germany
The Sony Cooperation, New York, New York
National Savings & Trust Co. Collection, Washington, D.C.
Jan von Haefter Collection, West Germany
Wellington Management Fund, Boston, Massachusetts
Morton Newman Collection, Chicago, Illinois
Sidney & Frances Lewis Collection, Richmond, Virginia

Technimatric Inc. Collection, New York, New York
Security Pacific National Bank Collection, New York, New York
Confluence Collection, New York, New York
Lawrence Ruben Co. Collection, New York, New York
Vesti Cooperation Collection, Boston Massachusetts
Hong Kong Museum of Art, Hong Kong
Eslite Collection, Taipei, Taiwan
Taipei Fine Arts Museum, Taipei, Taiwan
Taiwan Fine Arts Museum, Taichung, Taiwan

References 

Taiwan Fine art museum profile in Chinese

External links 
Han Hsiang-Ning personal site
Han Hsiang-Ning Blog in Chinese

1939 births
Chinese emigrants to the United States
Living people
American artists of Chinese descent
Artists from New York City
New York University faculty